Rhodococcus opacus is a bacterium species in the genus Rhodococcus. It is moderately chemolithotrophic. Its genome has been sequenced. R. opacus possesses extensive catabolic pathways for both sugars and aromatics and can tolerate inhibitory compounds found in depolymerized biomass (e.g., phenolics and furfural)

References

Further reading

Alvarez, Héctor M. Biology of Rhodococcus. Vol. 16. Springer, 2010.

External links 

LPSN
Type strain of Rhodococcus opacus at BacDive -  the Bacterial Diversity Metadatabase

Mycobacteriales
Bacteria described in 1995